Paul Edward "Wally" Cavallini (born October 13, 1965) is a Canadian former ice hockey defenceman. He is the younger brother of former player Gino Cavallini, who was his teammate for several years with the St. Louis Blues. He is also the father of hockey prospect Cade Cavallini of the Oakland Jr. Grizzlies.

Background
Cavallini was born in Toronto, Ontario.

A steady defenceman with some offensive abilities, Cavallini was selected by the Washington Capitals in the 1984 NHL Entry Draft. He entered the NHL after a season at Providence College where the Friars lost in the National Championship to Rensselaer Polytechnic Institute and future NHL star Adam Oates. After playing parts of two seasons with the Capitals, he was traded to the St. Louis Blues where he would spend almost six seasons including his best campaign, the 1989–90 season.  He played in the 1990 All-Star game and led the league in plus/minus rating that season.  He then returned to the Capitals for a second tour during the 1992–93 NHL season in a trade that sent Kevin Miller to the Blues.  Cavallini would once again be traded by the Capitals, this time to the Dallas Stars where he would play until his retirement a few weeks into the 1995–96 NHL season.

In 564 NHL games, Cavallini scored 56 goals and 177 assists.

Cavallini missed 13 games during the 1990–91 season with a bizarre left index finger injury, in which he lost the tip of the finger. He suffered the injury while blocking a Doug Wilson slapshot during St. Louis' December 22, 1990, game vs. Chicago. The force of Wilson's shot literally severed the tip of Cavallini's  finger. Cavallini found the tip of the finger inside his glove. Doctors hoped they could re-attach the tip in surgery, but their efforts failed. The piece of the finger was removed and the exposed bone covered with grafted skin. Cavallini did not return to action until St. Louis' January 25, 1991, game at Detroit. He scored a goal in that game.

Awards and honors

Career statistics

References

External links

Profile at hockeydraftcentral.com

1965 births
Living people
Canadian people of Italian descent
Binghamton Whalers players
Canadian ice hockey defencemen
Dallas Stars players
Ice hockey people from Toronto
National Hockey League All-Stars
St. Louis Blues players
Washington Capitals draft picks
Washington Capitals players